This article presents a list of the historical events and publications of Australian literature during 1911.

Books 

 Edward Dyson – Tommy the Hawker and Snifter his Dog
 Sumner Locke – Mum Dawson, 'Boss' 
 Louise Mack – The Romance of a Woman of Thirty
 Ambrose Pratt
 Dan Kelly, Outlaw
 The Outlaws of Weddin Range
 Louis Stone – Jonah
 Steele Rudd – The Book of Dan
 Lilian Turner – April Girls

Short stories

 Randolph Bedford – Billy Pagan Mining Engineer
 Edward Dyson
 Benno and Some of the Push: Being Further 'Fact'ry 'Ands' Stories
 "A Domestic Difference"
 The Golden Shanty
 Norman Lindsay – "Fatty Bennett"
 Thomas Edward Spencer – That Droll Lady: Being Further Adventures of Mrs. Bridget McSweeney

Poetry 

 E. J. Brady – Bells and Hobbles
 Christopher Brennan – "The Wanderer: 1902- : 95"
 Victor J. Daley 
 "A Ballad of Eureka"
 Wine and Roses
 C.J. Dennis – "The Intro"
 Ella McFadyen – Outland Born and Other Verses
 Dorothea Mackellar – The Closed Door and Other Verses
 John Shaw Neilson
 "The Green Singer"
 "Love's Coming"
 "To a Blue Flower"
 Marie E.J. Pitt – The Horses of the Hills and Other Verses

Children's and young adults

 E. J. Brady – Tom Pagdin, Pirate
 Mary Grant Bruce – Mates at Billabong
 Ethel Turner – The Apple of Happiness

Drama

 Louis Esson – Three Short Plays

Births 

A list, ordered by date of birth (and, if the date is either unspecified or repeated, ordered alphabetically by surname) of births in 1911 of Australian literary figures, authors of written works or literature-related individuals follows, including year of death.

 16 February – Hal Porter, poet and short story writer (died 1984)
 1 March – Ian Mudie, poet (died 1976)
8 March – Eunice Hanger, playwright and educator (died 1972)
21 July – Cecily Crozier, artist, poet and literary editor who co-founded A Comment (died 2006)
 27 July – Colin Roderick, editor and critic (died 2000)
 29 July – Judah Waten, novelist (died 1985)
 28 October – Clem Christesen, poet and literary editor (died 2003)
 23 November – William Hart-Smith, poet (died 1990)
 31 December – Dal Stivens, novelist (died 1997)

Deaths 

A list, ordered by date of death (and, if the date is either unspecified or repeated, ordered alphabetically by surname) of deaths in 1911 of Australian literary figures, authors of written works or literature-related individuals follows, including year of birth.

 6 May – Thomas Edward Spencer, poet (born 1845)
 5 October – Price Warung, short story writer (born 1855)

See also 
 1911 in poetry
 List of years in literature
 List of years in Australian literature
1911 in literature
 1910 in Australian literature
1911 in Australia
1912 in Australian literature

References

Literature
Australian literature by year
20th-century Australian literature